A Love Supreme: Live in Seattle is a live album by American saxophonist John Coltrane, released on October 22, 2021, through Impulse! Records. It was recorded on October 2, 1965, at the Seattle jazz club The Penthouse, by saxophonist Joe Brazil. The tapes were found five years after Brazil's death in October 2008 by the saxophonist Steve Griggs. It is one of only two recorded live performances of Coltrane's 1965 album A Love Supreme, the other being a July 1965 recording from the Jazz à Juan jazz festival in Juan-les-Pins, Antibes, France, which was released in 2002 as part of the deluxe edition of A Love Supreme.

Critical reception

On review aggregator Metacritic, the album has a score of 92 out of 100 from seven critics' reviews, indicating "universal acclaim". A review in Relix calls this recording "a 75-minute journey through free-jazz heaven".

Track listing

Personnel

The John Coltrane Quartet
 John Coltrane – tenor saxophone, percussion
 Jimmy Garrison – double bass
 Elvin Jones – drums
 McCoy Tyner – piano

Additional personnel
 Carlos Ward – alto saxophone
 Pharoah Sanders – tenor saxophone, percussion
 Donald Garrett – double bass
 Joe Brazil – recording

Charts

References

2021 live albums
Impulse! Records live albums
John Coltrane live albums